Hutton-Westfold Observatory is an observatory for Monash University located on Martin St near the Clayton Campus, in Melbourne, Victoria, Australia.

It opened to the public on 23 March 2009. The name Hutton-Westfold is derived from the names of Don Hutton and Kevin Westfold who contributed to the field of astronomy as well as the education of students at Monash. The observatory houses a 27.5 cm aperture Schmidt-Cassegrain Telescope, which has a field of view of approximately 7'×5' (7 arcminutes by 5 arcminutes).

See also
 List of astronomical observatories

References

Astronomical observatories in Victoria (Australia)
Monash University
2009 establishments in Australia